The Myrtle Avenue Line, also called the Myrtle Avenue Elevated, is a fully elevated line of the New York City Subway as part of the BMT division. The line is the last surviving remnant of one of the original Brooklyn elevated railroads. The remnant line operates as a spur branch from the Jamaica Line to Bushwick, Ridgewood, and Middle Village, terminating at its original eastern terminal across the street from Lutheran Cemetery. Until 1969, the line continued west into Downtown Brooklyn and, until 1944, over the Brooklyn Bridge to the Park Row Terminal in Manhattan.

Extent and service
The following services use part or all of the BMT Myrtle Avenue Line:

The Myrtle Avenue Line is served by the  service. The line begins at Metropolitan Avenue in Middle Village, Queens. It heads southwest along a private right-of-way, eventually joining an elevated structure above Palmetto Street in Ridgewood and Myrtle Avenue in the Brooklyn neighborhood of Bushwick. Just before reaching Broadway (on which the BMT Jamaica Line operates), the line curves to the left and merges into the Jamaica Line tracks just east of the Myrtle Avenue station. The still-existing upper level of the station, which was called "Broadway", opened in 1889 and closed on October 4, 1969.

History

Opening

The first section of the line ran over Myrtle Avenue from Johnson and Adams Streets to a junction with what was then known as the Main Line at Grand Avenue. It opened on April 10, 1888, by the Union Elevated Railroad Company, which was leased to the Brooklyn Elevated Railroad for its operation. Trains continued along Grand Avenue and Lexington Avenue to Broadway, where the line joined the Broadway Elevated, and then along Broadway to East New York. On September 1, 1888, the line was extended westward along Adams Street and Sands Street, to a terminal at Washington Street for the Brooklyn Bridge. On April 27, 1889, the line was extended east along Myrtle Avenue to Broadway, and to Wyckoff Avenue (at the Brooklyn/Queens border) on July 20, 1889. However, the station at Knickerbocker Avenue did not open until August 15, 1889.

The west end of the line was extended north along Adams Street to an elevated station over Sands Street and High Street in 1896. The connection to the Brooklyn Bridge tracks opened on June 18, 1898, along a private right-of-way halfway between Concord Street and Cathedral Place. The first trains to use it came from the Fifth Avenue Elevated (using the Myrtle Avenue El west of Hudson Avenue).

In 1906 the el was connected via a ramp to the Lutheran Cemetery Line, a former steam dummy line to Metropolitan Avenue that had opened on September 3, 1881. That section was elevated as part of the Dual Contracts on February 22, 1915.

Connection to the Broadway Line
On July 29, 1914, the connection to the Broadway-Brooklyn Line was opened, allowing Myrtle Avenue Line trains to operate via the Williamsburg Bridge. Construction on this connection began in August 1913. This service became BMT 10 in 1924, and the original Myrtle Avenue Line service to Park Row became BMT 11, later referred to as M and MJ (although the MJ designation never appeared on any equipment used on the line).

As part of the Dual Contracts rebuilding of the Myrtle Avenue El, a third track was installed north of Myrtle Avenue. This track started from a point south of Central Avenue through Myrtle – Wyckoff Avenues to a bumper just south of Seneca Avenue. The only switches were at the southern end so the center track could only be used for layups (parking). It was never used in revenue service and was removed by 1946.

In Fiscal Year 1930, the platforms at Seneca Avenue were lengthened to accommodate an eight-car train of Standard subway cars.

Truncation and later years
On March 5, 1944, the line west of Bridge–Jay Streets was closed coincident with the end of elevated service over the Brooklyn Bridge. On January 21, 1953, the Grand Avenue station was closed so that it could be torn down and therefore complete the demolition of the BMT Lexington Avenue Line. The rest of the line from Broadway to Jay Street closed on October 4, 1969, and was demolished soon afterward, ending the MJ service. A free transfer to the B54 bus replaced the MJ, and service was increased on that bus. The free transfer at Jay Street was also replaced with a bus transfer.

In July 2017, the Metropolitan Transportation Authority started rebuilding two parts of the Myrtle Avenue Line, the  approaches to the junction with the BMT Jamaica Line (which lasted until April 2018, requiring suspension of service between Wyckoff and Myrtle Avenues), and the Fresh Pond Bridge over the Montauk Branch in Queens (which lasted from July to September 2017). This work was undertaken in preparation for a reconstruction of the BMT Canarsie Line tunnels under the East River, which took place between 2019 and 2020. Regular service resumed on April 30, 2018.

Chaining information
The entire line is chained BMT M. This has no relation to the fact that the M service operates on the line, though both letters may have been chosen because 'Myrtle' begins with 'M'.
The tracks on the line are M1 towards Metropolitan Avenue and M2 towards Manhattan.
Chaining zero is BMT Eastern, located at the intersection of the line of the Brooklyn Bridge and the Chambers Street station on the BMT Nassau Street Line by way of the now-dismantled original BMT Brooklyn Bridge Elevated Line and the original Myrtle Avenue Elevated through downtown Brooklyn.
As originally surveyed, this line was measured in a railroad east direction from Park Row. Once the Board of Transportation took over the system, the direction was reversed so that railroad north on this line became towards Manhattan, and corresponds roughly to a westerly to southwesterly compass direction.

Station listing

References

Further reading
 "The New Road Opened", The New York Times, April 11, 1888, page 8
 "City and Suburban News", The New York Times, April 28, 1889, page 6
 "New of the Railroads", The New York Times, January 9, 1896, page 15
 "Park Row to Sheepshead Bay", The New York Times, June 19, 1898, page 5
 "1,200 on Last Trip on Myrtle Ave. El; Cars Are Stripped", The New York Times, October 4, 1969, page 23
 "Brooklyn Elevated", James Clifford Greller, Xplorer Press, 2017

External links

 
 
 
 NYCsubway.org – BMT Myrtle Branch
  "Myrtle Ave El, Oct. 1969, plus a few earlier shots"

Brooklyn–Manhattan Transit Corporation
New York City Subway lines
Railway lines opened in 1889